The World Tamil Conference is a series of occasional conferences to discuss the social growth of the Tamil language. Each conference is attended by thousands of Tamil enthusiasts around the world. Conferences are hosted in various cities in India, as well as world cities with a significant Tamil population. The conference aims in promoting the heritage of Tamil language

A similar conference called World Classical Tamil Conference 2010, unapproved by the International Association for Tamil Research, was held in Tamil Nadu conducted by the Government of Tamil Nadu under the leadership of M. Karunanidhi. Not all agreed with the academic and intellectual rigour of the latter event. Despite these criticisms upholding such a huge event portraying the value of Tamil language and culture is being appreciated vastly and credited to the DMK supremo as commonly believed by the people in the state of Tamil Nadu. The theme song of the World Classical Tamil conference, Semmozhiyana Thamizh mozhiyam, was composed by Oscar award winner A. R. Rahman. The song was written by M. Karunanidhi where he has used popular quotes from Sangam poetry.

The latest edition of the conference was held on July 3–7, 2019 in Chicago. The 10th conference was jointly hosted by International Association of Tamil Research, Federation of Tamil Sangams in North America (FeTNA) and Chicago Tamil Sangam (CTS).
. The theme song of the 10th World Tamil Conference was composed by  American Composer Rajan Somasundaram, titled 'Yathum Oore Anthem'. He has composed the first ever musical form for the 2000 year old poetry, Yathum Oore, written by Sangam period poet Kaniyan Pungundranar. Rajan mentioned that as a tribute to one of the most progressive ancient poetry that calls for unity and equality, he composed the theme song to cover multiple genres of music and brought in many international musicians of varying genres, ethnicity and languages including academy nominated singer Bombay Jayashri and Karthik (singer).

List of conferences

References

Further reading 

Tamil diaspora
Language advocacy organizations
Tamil language
Cultural conferences
Recurring events established in 1966

External links 
First International Conference Seminar of Tamil Studies, 1966